Antroposthia is a genus of worms belonging to the family Antroposthiidae.

Species:

Antroposthia axi 
Antroposthia unipora

References

Acoelomorphs